The Cheddar's 300 was a NASCAR Xfinity Series stock car race at Bristol Motor Speedway, the first of two Bristol races on the schedule.

The first Busch Series race at Bristol was 150 laps, and was won by Phil Parsons in 1982. The race was not held in 1984. The race increased in length several times since then: it was lengthened to 200 laps in 1985, 250 laps in 1990, and 300 laps in 2006.

In 2016, the race format was changed to include two 50-lap heat races and a 200-lap feature for a total of 300 laps, as part of the Xfinity Dash 4 Cash program. In 2017 that format did not return and instead reverted to its 300-lap distance with the new stage format. Stages 1 and 2 were 85 laps each, with stage 3 being the final 130 laps.

The race was removed from the 2021 schedule as the Xfinity Series did not follow the NASCAR Cup and Camping World Truck Series in switching their first Bristol races to the dirt configuration.

Past winners

2005 and 2020: Race extended due to a NASCAR overtime finish.
2005: Race postponed from Saturday to Monday due to rain.
2006: Race had a snow delay after 32 laps, which led to it finishing under the lights.
2008: Race shortened due to rain.
2015: Joey Logano won the race after leading all 300 laps.
2016: The main event was reduced to 200 laps, while the other 100 laps were divided into two heat races for the Xfinity Dash 4 Cash program.
2020: Race postponed from April 4 to May 30 due to the COVID-19 pandemic, then postponed until June 1 due to logistical issues resulting from the postponement of Cup race at Charlotte from May 27 to May 28.

Multiple winners (drivers)

Multiple winners (teams)

Manufacturer wins

Qualifying race winners

References

External links
 

1982 establishments in Tennessee
2020 disestablishments in Tennessee
NASCAR Xfinity Series races
Former NASCAR races
 
Recurring sporting events established in 1982
Recurring sporting events disestablished in 2021